Crestline High School is a public high school in Crestline, Ohio, United States. It is the only high school in the Crestline Exempted Village School District.

Ohio High School Athletic Association State Championships
 Girls' softball – 2004

Athletic league affiliations
League of Six Nations: 1933-1940
Independent: 1940-1944
Northern Ohio League: 1944-1954
Independent: 1954-1961
Johnny Appleseed Conference: 1961-1977
Mid-Ohio Conference: 1977-1990
North Central Conference: 1990-2014
Northern 10 Athletic Conference: 2014-2015
Mid-Buckeye Conference: 2015-
Northwest Central Conference (football only):
2021-

Notable alumni
 Gates Brown, former MLB player (Detroit Tigers)
 Jack Harbaugh, former player and coach

Notes and references

External links
 District website

High schools in Crawford County, Ohio
Public high schools in Ohio
Public middle schools in Ohio